is a Japanese manga series written and illustrated by Yoshinobu Yamada. It follows a group of teenage survivors of a plane crash who find themselves in a mysterious island inhabited by extinct prehistoric creatures and plants. It was serialized in Kodansha's Weekly Shōnen Magazine from November 2008 to January 2013, with its chapters collected in 21 tankōbon volumes. It has been licensed for English language release in North America by Kodansha USA.

Plot

Akira Sengoku and his classmates are flying back to Japan from their school trip to Guam, along with other classes from their school and various passengers. Their trip, however, takes an unexpected turn when their plane hits turbulence and crashes on a Pacific island. After recovering from being unconscious, Akira learns from his friends that they are on a mysterious island filled with extinct prehistoric creatures and plants. With nowhere to go, Akira leads a small group of survivors to find others like them. They search for a way to get home, fighting off the island's savage creatures and encountering other survivors who have gone mad. Along the way, they will discover the mysteries and secrets of the island, all whilst struggling to survive there.

Publication
Written and illustrated by Yoshinobu Yamada, the manga Cage of Eden was serialized in Kodansha's Weekly Shōnen Magazine from November 26, 2008, to January 23, 2013. Kodansha collected its chapters in twenty-three tankōbon volumes, released from February 17, 2009, to February 15, 2013.

On December 12, 2010, Kodansha USA announced that they had licensed the manga for English language release in North America.

Volume list

Reception
Katherine Dacey of The Manga Critic reviewed the first manga volume saying while she disliked the characters for "doing and saying things that defy common sense", she praised the author for "populating the island with scary-looking monsters and staging thrilling action sequences that temporarily erase the memory of the clumsy dialogue and panty shots". Brigid Alverson of MTV Geek reviewed the first manga volume concluding "The story has been told before, and Cage of Eden is no literary or philosophical masterpiece, but taken on its own terms as an action-suspense story, it delivers the goods and leaves the reader wanting more.

Rebecca Silverman of Anime News Network enjoyed the first manga volume and gave it a B, saying, "Despite its slow start, Cage of Eden becomes deeply engrossing, so that once a certain point is reached, it is nearly impossible to put down."

See alsoDeathtopia, another manga series by the same authorSatanophany'', another manga series by the same author

References

External links
 Official Website at Kodansha 
 

Mystery anime and manga
Kodansha manga
Shōnen manga
Survival anime and manga
Suspense anime and manga